The Croses EC-6 Criquet ("Locust") is a 1960s French two-seat homebuilt aircraft designed by Emilien Croses.

Development
The EC-6 Criquet is a design for a homebuilt aircraft with a tailwheel landing gear, and tandem wing configuration similar to the Mignet Pou-du-Ciel family. It has two side-by-side seats. It first flew in 1965, and seven examples had flown by 1977, with more than 60 known to be under construction.

The EC-6 Criquet Léger (Mini Criquet) is an ultralight variant.

The LC-6 Criquet is an improved version developed by Gilbert Landray.

The LC-10 Criquet was developed by a Mr Millet of Société Co-Plasud who used fibreglass construction throughout the entire aircraft. It was used as a trainer by the Aéro-Club du Maconnais. While considerably more expensive to build than a conventional wooden Criquet, the fibreglass version was also  heavier.

Operational history
As well as being used for local flying, the Criquet has been flown to both national and international light aircraft rallies. A French owned example visited the 1992 rally at RAF Wroughton airfield near Swindon, Wiltshire, England.

Variants
EC-6 Criquet (English:cricket) The original version designed by Emilien Croses.
EC-6 Criquet Léger An ultralight version.
LC-6 Criquet (LC - Landray-Coses) The EC-6 modified and improved by Gilbert Landray.
LC-10 Criquet (LC - Laibie-Coses) An all fibre-glass version of the EC-6 built by M. Millet of Société Co-Plasud (president of the Aero-club de l'Aude). A second LC-10 was built by M. Barrière.

Specifications (EC-6 no.01 Criquet)

See also

References

Further reading

Criquet
1960s French civil utility aircraft
Homebuilt aircraft
Single-engined tractor aircraft
Tandem-wing aircraft
Aircraft first flown in 1965